Ralph Biggs (born February 2, 1976) is an American-born naturalized Belgian former professional basketball player. Biggs is 2.01 m tall and played the small forward position.

Career
He played for PBC Ural Great in the Russian Super League. He played college basketball at Towson University. He played in Ostende, Charleroi, Liège and Antwerp (all Belgian teams).

Biggs led the 2000–01 Euroleague in steals per game averaging 2.1. He competed for two seasons at the Euroleague level in 2000–01 and 2001–02 with Telindus Oostende.

In the 2010/11 season he was playing for the French club Limoges CSP Elite until he left the club.	

In February 2011 he signed with Antwerp Giants. In June 2013, Biggs signed a one-year deal with VOO Wolves Verviers-Pepinster.

Biggs is currently the head girls' basketball coach at his native Washington High School in Beaufort County, North Carolina. He was named 2-A Eastern Plains Conference coach of the year after his first season. After taking over coaching duties for the boys' team midway through the 2016 season, Biggs became the full-time coach for both varsity squads in 2017.

References

External links 
Fibaeurope.com Profile
Euroleague.net Profile

1976 births
Living people
American expatriate basketball people in Belgium
American expatriate basketball people in France
American expatriate basketball people in Russia
American expatriate basketball people in the Netherlands
Antwerp Giants players
Basketball players from North Carolina
BC Krasnye Krylia players
BC Oostende players
Dutch Basketball League players
Liège Basket players
Limoges CSP players
BSW (basketball club) players
PBC Ural Great players
Spirou Charleroi players
Towson Tigers men's basketball players
People from Washington, North Carolina
American men's basketball players
Guards (basketball)

American emigrants to Belgium
Naturalised citizens of Belgium